J. J. Syvrud (born May 10, 1977) is a former American football linebacker who played one season with the New York Jets of the National Football League (NFL). He was drafted by the Jets in the seventh round of the 1999 NFL Draft. He played college football at Jamestown College and attended Rock Springs High School in Rock Springs, Wyoming J.J later went on to be an assistant coach for Rock Springs High School.

College career
Syvrud participated in football and track at Jamestown College. He was inducted into the Jamestown College Athletic Hall of Fame in 2006.

Professional career
Syvrud was selected by the New York Jets with the 235th pick in the 1999 NFL Draft and signed with the team on June 18, 1999. He played in one game for the Jets during the 1999 season. He was released by the Jets and signed to the team's practice squad on August 29, 2000. Syvrud was released by the Jets on September 1, 2001.

References

External links
Just Sports Stats
NFL Draft Scout

Living people
1977 births
Players of American football from Wyoming
American football linebackers
Jamestown Jimmies football players
New York Jets players
People from Rock Springs, Wyoming